The Bishop of Taunton is an episcopal title used by a suffragan bishop of the Church of England Diocese of Bath and Wells, in the Province of Canterbury, England. The title was first created under the Suffragan Bishops Act 1534 and takes its name after Taunton, the county town of Somerset.

Ruth Worsley was consecrated Bishop of Taunton on 29 September 2015.

List of bishops

References

External links
 Crockford's Clerical Directory - Listings

 
Taunton